Saitonia is a genus of Asian sheet weavers that was first described by K. Y. Eskov in 1992.

Species
 it contains six species, found in Korea, Japan, and China:
Saitonia kawaguchikonis Saito & Ono, 2001 – China, Japan
Saitonia longicephala (Saito, 1988) – Japan
Saitonia muscus (Saito, 1989) (type) – Japan
Saitonia ojiroensis (Saito, 1990) – Japan
Saitonia orientalis (Oi, 1960) – Japan
Saitonia pilosus Seo, 2011 – Korea

See also
 List of Linyphiidae species (Q–Z)

References

Araneomorphae genera
Linyphiidae
Spiders of Asia